The Diocese of Calicut is a Latin Church ecclesiastical territory or diocese in India. It is a suffragan diocese in the ecclesiastical province of the metropolitan Archdiocese of Verapoly but depends on the missionary Roman Congregation for the Evangelization of Peoples.

Its cathedral is Mother of God Cathedral, dedicated to Our Lady, in the episcopal see of Kozhikode (Calicut).

Statistics 
, it pastorally served 48,250 Catholics (0.6% of 8,059,057 total population) on 8,036 km² in 41 parishes and 3 missions with 132 priests (57 diocesan, 75 religious), 837 lay religious (127 brothers, 710 sisters) and 12 seminarians.

History 
 12 June 1923: Established as Diocese of Calicut on territories split off from the Roman Catholic Diocese of Coimbatore, Diocese of Mangalore and Diocese of Mysore
 On 1949 it gained territory from Metropolitan Archdiocese of Pondicherry
 Lost territories repeatedly : on 31 December 1953 to establish Diocese of Tellicherry, on 1998.11.05 to establish Diocese of Kannur, on 28 December 2013 to establish Diocese of Sultanpet.

Episcopal Ordinaries 

Suffragan Bishops of Calicut
 Paolo Charles Perini, Jesuits (S.J.) (born Italy) (12 June 1923 – death 28 June 1932); previously Bishop of Mangalore (India) (17 August 1910 – 12 June 1923), remaining Apostolic Administrator of Mangalore (1923 – 1928)
 Leone Proserpio, S.J. (born Italy) (2 December 1937 – death 8 September 1945)
 Aldus Maria Patroni, S.J. (first native Indian incumbent) (8 April 1948 – retired 7 June 1980), died 1988
 Maxwell Valentine Noronha (7 June 1980 – retired 19 April 2002), died 2018
 Joseph Kalathiparambil (19 April 2002 – 22 February 2011); next Secretary (second-in-command) of the Pontifical Council for the Pastoral Care of Migrants and Itinerants (22 February 2011 – 31 October 2016) and Metropolitan Archbishop of Verapoly (India) (31 October 2016 – ...)
 Varghese Chakkalakal (15 May 2012 - ...), also Secretary General of Conference of Catholic Bishops of India (17 August 2013 – 6 February 2017); previously Bishop of Kannur (India) (5 November 1998 – 15 May 2012), remaining Apostolic Administrator of Kannur (15 May 2012 – 1 February 2014).

See also 
 List of Catholic dioceses in India

References

Sources and External links 
 GCatholic, with Google satellite HQ picture - data for all sections 
 diocesan website 
 Catholic Hierarchy 

Roman Catholic dioceses in India
1923 establishments in India
Christianity in Kerala
History of Kozhikode
Religious organizations established in 1923
Roman Catholic dioceses and prelatures established in the 20th century
Churches in Kozhikode district